Joey Mente (February 24, 1976 – August 22, 2018) was a Filipino professional basketball player in the Philippine Basketball Association who last played for the Welcoat Dragons. He was drafted 10th overall by the San Miguel Beermen in 2001.

Career
Mente first played for the Iloilo Mega Volts standout in the defunct Metropolitan Basketball Association during the maiden season of the league.

Mente was drafted by the San Miguel Beermen and played there from 2001-2005. Though his height was 5'10", he participated in the PBA Slam Dunk Contest, and won as the "2001 Slam Dunk King". In the 2006-07 PBA season, he played 20 games for Welcoat in the 2006-07 PBA season and averaged 8.3 points per game 2.6 rebounds per game and 1.7 assists per game.

Illness and death
In 2018, Mente was diagnosed with two tumors, one in his head and the other in his chest, and underwent surgery. He later had radiation treatment and went home to Samar for chemotherapy. He died on August 22, 2018, at the age of 42.

References

External links
Player Profile
PBA-Online! Profile

1976 births
2018 deaths
Basketball players from Northern Samar
Filipino men's basketball players
People from Northern Samar
Point guards
Rain or Shine Elasto Painters players
San Miguel Beermen players
Deaths from cancer in the Philippines
Lyceum Pirates basketball players
San Miguel Beermen draft picks